Back to Freedom and Dignity is a philosophic work by American theologian and apologist Francis A. Schaeffer, Downers Grove:InterVarsity Press, first published in 1972. It is Book Four in Volume One of The Complete Works of Francis A. Schaeffer A Christian Worldview. Westchester, IL:Crossway Books, 1982.

Overview
This short work by Schaeffer is an answer to the work of B.F. Skinner and others, arguing that the freedom and dignity of man are God-given and therefore can't be left aside without dire consequences.

Contents 

 Jacques Monod: Chance and Necessity
 Francis Crick: Why I Study Biology
 The Abuse of Genetic Knowledge
 Probing the Brain
 Ice-Cube Babies
 Kenneth Clark: A Pill for Peace
 Skinner: Beyond Freedom and Dignity
 Christianity and Conditioning
 How Like a Dog!
 Conclusion

References
 Richard H. Bube. (Review) Journal of the American Scientific Association, Vol 25, September 1973, pp. 124–26. Available on line. Retrieved 7 October 2006.
 J. R. Kennedy. (Review) Christianity Today, Vol 17, December 22, 1972, pp. 26–27.

1972 non-fiction books
Books about Christianity